"Stop Breaking Down" or "Stop Breakin' Down Blues" is a Delta blues song recorded by Robert Johnson in 1937. An "upbeat boogie with a strong chorus line", the lyrics are partly based on Johnson's experience with certain women:

The song shares elements with earlier blues songs and became popular largely through later interpretations by other artists, such as Sonny Boy Williamson I in 1945 and the Rolling Stones in 1972.

Recording and composition
Robert Johnson recorded "Stop Breakin' Down Blues" during his last recording session in 1937 in Dallas, Texas. The song is a solo piece with Johnson providing guitar accompaniment to his vocals.  Several songs have been identified as "melodic precedents": "Caught Me Wrong Again" (Memphis Minnie, 1936),  "Stop Hanging Around" (Buddy Moss, 1935), and "You Got to Move" (Memphis Minnie and Joe McCoy, 1934).

Of his Dallas recordings, it is Johnson's most uptempo song, with "his exhuberant vocal driv[ing] home the story line". Two takes of the song were recorded, both sounding very similar, although Johnson flubbed the opening verse of the second take.  Although the song is played in a fretted guitar style, on both takes Johnson added a brief slide coda that comes across "like a little inside joke".

The second take was selected for release on March 20, 1938, with "Honeymoon Blues" as the flip side. In 1970, the first take was included on Johnson's King of the Delta Blues Singers, Vol. II album. Both were later included on the 1990 box set The Complete Recordings.

Recordings by blues artists
In 1945, Sonny Boy Williamson I adapted "Stop Breaking Down" as an early Chicago blues with Big Maceo (piano), Tampa Red (guitar), and Charles Sanders (drums). Titled "Stop Breaking Down", the song featured somewhat different lyrics, including the refrain "I don't believe you really really love me, I think you just like the way my music sounds" in place of Johnson's "The stuff I got it gon' bust your brains out, hoo hoo, it'll make you lose your mind". Williamson's song inspired the versions sung "by most postwar Chicago blues artists".

In 1954, Baby Boy Warren recorded it as a Chicago-style blues shuffle, but used most of Johnson's lyrics. Forest City Joe recorded the song in 1959, which was released on a compilation album The Blues Roll On. In the late 1960s, Junior Wells with Buddy Guy recorded "Stop Breaking Down" for the Coming at You Baby (1968) and Southside Blues Jam (1969) albums. Their versions are medleys which incorporate lyrics from "Five Long Years" and Sonny Boy Williamson's "Stop Breaking Down". The White Stripes recorded the song for their 1999 self-titled debut album. Critic Chris Handyside identified their choice as inspired and added that Jack White's vocal delivery manages to convey Johnson's sense of desperation.

The Rolling Stones version

The Rolling Stones recorded "Stop Breaking Down" for their 1972 Exile on Main St. album. They interpreted the song somewhat differently from the earlier versions, with prominent slide guitar work by Mick Taylor and Mick Jagger providing the harmonica and guitar. The Rolling Stones' only live performance of the song (with Robert Cray on slide guitar and lead vocals) is included on their The Rolling Stones: Voodoo Lounge Live concert DVD.

After the release of Exile on Main St., Allen Klein sued the Rolling Stones for breach of settlement because Jagger and Richards had created their version of "Stop Breaking Down" and composed four other songs on the album while they were under contract with his company, ABKCO. ABKCO acquired publishing rights to the songs, giving it a share of the royalties from Exile on Main St., and was able to publish another album of previously released Rolling Stones songs, More Hot Rocks (Big Hits & Fazed Cookies).

Lawsuit over copyright
"Stop Breakin' Down Blues" (along with "Love in Vain") was the subject of a lawsuit regarding the copyright for the song. In 2000, the court held that the songs were not in the public domain and that legal title belonged to the Estate of Robert Johnson and its successors.

Notes

References

1937 songs
Robert Johnson songs
Songs written by Robert Johnson
Sonny Boy Williamson I songs
The Rolling Stones songs
The White Stripes songs
Blues songs
Song recordings produced by Don Law